Mark Ronald is an American engineer who works in the defense industry. Until 2007-01-02 he was President & CEO of BAE Systems Inc., the US subsidiary of BAE Systems plc and also served as a board member and Chief Operating Officer of BAE Systems plc.

In 2006 Ronald was received the John Curtis Sword Award from Aviation Week. The magazine's President Tom Henricks said "[Ronald's] energy and leadership across the Atlantic reflects the spirit of the Curtis Sword to foster Anglo-American aerospace cooperation."

He is a graduate of Bucknell University, where he received a Bachelor of Science in electrical engineering. He received his Master of Science in electrical engineering from the Polytechnic Institute of New York (now New York University Tandon School of Engineering).

References

BAE Systems people
Living people
Polytechnic Institute of New York University alumni
Year of birth missing (living people)